Ootann Road is a continuous  road route in the Mareeba and Tablelands local government areas of Queensland, Australia. It is  a north-south link between the Burke Developmental Road and the Kennedy Highway, servicing a number of cattle grazing and production areas in northern Queensland.

Route description

The road initially follows the Etheridge railway line, passing a side road that leads to Ootann railway station and Ootann airport. It crosses the Sandy Tate River as it enters Barwidgi. It continues to follow the line until it reaches the former Gelaro railway station, where it crosses the line before the railway turns to the west and the road turns south-east, then south. Continuing south it crosses the Rocky Tate River and turns south-east, entering Forty Mile from the west. It then turns east, where it again crosses the Sandy Tate River. The road continues generally east across Forty Mile and Gunnawarra before meeting the Kennedy Highway.

Land use along this road is mainly stock grazing on native vegetation. There are no major intersections on this road.

Road condition

In November 2021 funding of $7.4 million under the Roads of Strategic Importance program was announced for this road.

Roads of Strategic Importance
Roads of Strategic Importance (ROSI) is a $5.8 billion initiative of the Australian Government to help connect regional businesses to markets, and to better connect regional communities. It primarily funds road infrastructure in designated strategic corridors. The $7.4 million for Ootann Road is in addition to previously funded projects for the Cairns to Northern Territory Border corridor.

History

Almaden was settled as a mining town prior to 1894, when its first school opened. Several pastoral runs were established in the district.

Over time other pastoral runs were established in the surrounding area.

Early roads were cut from both Almaden and Gunnawarra to provide access for wheeled vehicles to the pastoral runs and other settlements. Over time these tracks were improved and extended to eventually form a through road.

Modern usage
Although not yet fully sealed the road is used extensively by road trains carrying cattle, and by other large trucks conveying heavy goods.

References

Roads in Queensland